Solstice festival may refer to:
 Festivals occurring on the winter solstice
 Festivals occurring on the summer solstice

See also
 Solstice